The Senior Service is a nickname for the Royal Navy.

Senior Service may also refer to:
 Senior Service (cigarette)
 "Senior Service", a song by Elvis Costello from the album Armed Forces

See also
 Service by a United States federal judge in senior status